Hayk Gyokchyan (born December 11, 1989 in Yerevan) is a Lebanese professional basketball player. He currently plays for Riyadi Beirut in the Lebanese Basketball League. He finished his college season at Franklin & Marshall College.

In early 2014 receiving an offer from Homenetmen Beirut B.C., he played briefly in the club, before joining Hekmeh B.C. Homenetmen fans used to boo him for leaving home to play for money in Sagesse/Hekmeh B.C. In 2016, Hayk came back to play for his home club Homenetmen, and then joined another club, Riyadi Beirut.

Gyokchyan is the son of Lebanese-Armenian basketball coach Tigran Gyokchyan.

Personal Information

Born: December 11, 1989 Yerevan, Armenia

Nationality: Lebanese, Armenian

Listed Height: 203 cm (6 ft 8in)

Early life and education:

Hayk Gyokchyan was born in Yerevan, Armenia on December 11, 1989. He moved to Lebanon at the age of 2 where he spent his life studying and playing basketball from a young age. He was granted Lebanese citizenship at the age of 16 in March 2006 by the Lebanese Government with the help of the Lebanese Basketball Federation. In 2006 after the Lebanese Israeli war, he moved to USA where he attended Conwell-Egan Catholic High School in Pennsylvania for his junior and senior seasons. After graduating, Gyokchyan decided to do a postgraduate year at The Lawrenceville School in New Jersey. He was recruited by Franklin & Marshall College as a student athlete. He graduated from F&M in 2013 with a BA in Business, Organizations & Society while minoring in Applied Mathematics. He then returned to Lebanon to play professional basketball and has been doing so since 2013. He acquired a Master’s Degree in Sports Management & Leadership from a joint program from MUBS (Modern University for Business & Sciences) and Cardiff Metropolitan University in Wales, United Kingdom. His dissertation covered strategic planning in the first division basketball clubs in the Lebanese Basketball League.

Basketball Career:

Junior Career:

Hayk Gyokchyan was regarded as one of the best Lebanese prospects since a young age. He represented the junior national team from 2006 till 2008 during which time Lebanon qualified for the World U18 Championship for the first time in history in 2006.

College Career:

Hayk Gyokchyan was a 4 year player at Franklin & Marshall College. He played for coach Glenn Robinson, the winningest coach in NCAA D3 history. At his time at F&M, Gyokchyan won the Centennial League 3 times and qualified for the NCAA D3 Tournament 3 times. He made the Elite 8 his freshman and junior seasons in 2010 and 2012. During his senior season, he scored his 1000th point in January 2013, hanging his name in the rafters after graduation. He was selected as an All-American by the NABC coaches committee in NCAA Division 3 in 2013.

Professional Career:

In 2013, Hayk Gyokchyan returned to Lebanon to play professionally. He started with Homenetmen Beirut his rookie season. He finished as a top 10 scorer among the locals which earned him a 2 year deal with Sagesse at the conclusion of the season. His 2nd year in Sagesse, he made it to the finals and lost to Al Riyadi 4-2. He then inked a 2 year deal with Homenetmen Beirut. During his second year, Gyokchyan was the MVP of the Arab Club Championship held in Morocco where Homenetmen won the final against hosts Sala Club. He was a major contributor for the club’s first ever championship in the LBL beating Al Riyadi 4-3. He then moved to Al Riyadi in 2018 where he won 5 major cups in the first season. Gyokchyan signed for Beirut Club for the 2021-2022 season during which he was the MVP of the regular season and his team the league. He then went back to Al Riyadi and is currently playing there.

National Team:

Because Gyokchyan obtained Lebanese citizenship after the age of 16, Hayk was not able to represent the senior national team in official FIBA competitions. However, due to emotional ties to the country and having played in Lebanon all his career and living in the country almost all his life, FIBA granted him eligibility to play for the national team in November 2021. He has since been selected to play every game for the Cedars and has been a key factor of the success of the Cedars in recent competitions. He won the Arab Championship for the first time in Lebanon’s history, finished second in FIBA ASIA Cup in Indonesia in 2022, and punched a ticket for the FIBA WORLD CHAMPIONSHIP to be held in 2023.

Career Info

High School: Connell-Egan Catholic High School (Fairlrss Hills, Pennsylvania, USA 2006-2008)

The Lawrenceville School (Lawrenceville, New Jersey, USA 2008-2009)

College: Franklin & Marshall College (Lancaster, Pennsylvania, USA 2009-2013)

NBA Draft: 2013 Undrafted

Playing Career: 2013–present

2013-2014: Homenetmen Beirut

2014-2016: Sagesse Club

2016-2018: Homenetmen Beirut

2018-2021: Al Riyadi

2021-2022: Beirut Club

2022–present: Al Riyadi

Medals:

3rd place FIBA U18 Asian Championhip 2006 Urumqi, China with Lebanon U18 NT

1st place U18 Arab Championship 2006 Homs, Syria with Lebanon U18 NT

1st place Centennial Conference 2010 2011 & 2012 in USA with Franklin & Marshall College

1st place Arab Club Championship Rabat, Morocco 2017 with Homenetmen

1st place 2018 LBL with Homenetmen Beirut

1st place 2019 Dubai Tournament with Al Riyadi

1st place 2019 LBL with Al Riyadi

1st place 2021 Eurasian Championship in Yerevan, Armenia with Al Riyadi

1st place 2021 LBL with Al Riyadi

1st place 2022 LBL with Beirut Club

1st place 2022 Arab NT Championship in Dubai, UAE with Lebanon NT

2nd place 2022 FIBA ASIA Cup in Jakarta, Indonesia with Lebanon NT

References

External links 

1990 births
Living people
Franklin & Marshall Diplomats men's basketball players
Lebanese men's basketball players
Power forwards (basketball)
Sportspeople from Beirut
Armenian emigrants to Lebanon
Sagesse SC basketball players
Al Riyadi Club Beirut basketball players